Markus Brunner (born 18 May 1973) is an Italian ice hockey player. He competed in the men's tournament at the 1998 Winter Olympics.

References

1973 births
Living people
Italian ice hockey players
Olympic ice hockey players of Italy
Ice hockey players at the 1998 Winter Olympics
Sportspeople from Merano
Oshawa Generals players
Bolzano HC players
HC Merano players
Courmaosta HC players
Italian expatriate ice hockey people
Italian expatriate sportspeople in Canada